The 2012 Mid-American Conference football season is the 67th season for the Mid-American Conference (MAC). The University of Massachusetts joins the conference to create a 13-team, two-division league. Last season at the Marathon MAC Championship game, Northern Illinois defeated Ohio 23–20 for the championship.

Preseason

Pre-season Coaches changes

Terry Bowden was hired as Akron 27th head coach before the season started.  Chuck Amato was named the associate head coach and defensive coordinator.

Transfers

Regular season

Week One

2012 MAC Specialty Award Winners
Vern Smith Leadership Award Winner:  QB Jordan Lynch, Northern Illinois
Coach of the Year:  Darrell Hazell, Kent State
Offensive Player of the Year:  QB Jordan Lynch, Northern Illinois
Defensive Player of the Year:  DT Chris Jones, Bowling Green
Special Teams Player of the Year: KR Dri Archer, Kent State
Freshman of the Year:  WR Jaime Wilson, Western Michigan

All Conference Teams
2012 All-MAC First Team Offense
Quarterback – Jordan Lynch, Northern Illinois
Center – Zac Kerin, Toledo
Offensive Linemen – Brian Winters, Kent State
Offensive Lineman – Eric Fisher, Central Michigan
Offensive Lineman – Dann O'Neill, Western Michigan
Offensive Linemen – Austin Holtz, Ball State
Tight End – Zane Fakes, Ball State
Wide Receiver – Martel Moore, Northern Illinois
Wide Receiver – Bernard Reedy, Toledo
Wide Receiver – Willie Snead IV, Ball State
Wide Receiver – Jamill Smith, Ball State
Running Back – Dri Archer, Kent State
Running Back – David Fluellen, Toledo
Placekicker – Steven Schott, Ball State
 
2012 All-MAC First Team Defense
Outside Linebacker – Khalil Mack, Buffalo 
Outside Linebacker –Gabe Martin, Bowling Green
Inside Linebacker – Dan Molls, Toledo
Inside Linebacker – Perry McIntyre, UMass
Down Lineman – Chris Jones, Bowling Green 
Down Lineman – Roosevelt Nix, Kent State 
Down Lineman – Sean Progar, Northern Illinois 
Down Lineman – Alan Baxter, Northern Illinois
Defensive Back – Jimmy Ward, Northern Illinois 
Defensive Back – Dayonne Nunley, Miami 
Defensive Back – BooBoo Gates, Bowling Green
Defensive Back – Jermaine Robinson, Toledo
Punter – Jay Karutz, Eastern Michigan

2012 All-MAC First Team Specialists
Kickoff Return Specialist – Dri Archer, Kent State
Punt Return Specialist –Bernard Reedy, Toledo
 
2012 All-MAC Second Team Offense
Quarterback – Keith Wenning, Ball State
Center – Skyler Allen, Ohio
Offensive Lineman – Eric Herman, Ohio 
Offensive Lineman – Josh Kline, Kent State
Offensive Lineman – Tyler Loos, Northern Illinois
Offensive Lineman – Jordan Roussos, Bowling Green
Tight End – Garrett Hoskins, Eastern Michigan 
Wide Receiver – Nick Harwell, Miami 
Wide Receiver – Alex Neutz, Buffalo
Wide Receiver – Jaime Wilson, Western Michigan
Wide Receiver – Titus Davis, Central Michigan 
Running Back – Beau Blankenship, Ohio
Running Back – Zurlon Tipton, Central Michigan
Placekicker – Matt Weller, Ohio 
 
2012 All-MAC Second Team Defense
Outside Linebacker – Tyrone Clark, Northern Illinois
Outside Linebacker – Justin Cudworth, Eastern Michigan 
Inside Linebacker – Travis Freeman, Ball State 
Inside Linebacker – Luke Batton, Kent State 
Down Lineman – Jonathan Newsome, Ball State
Down Lineman – Freddie Bishop, Western Michigan 
Down Lineman – Steven Means, Buffalo
Down Lineman – Andy Mulumba, Eastern Michigan
Defensive Back – Jahleel Addae, Central Michigan 
Defensive Back – Luke Wollet, Kent State 
Defensive Back – Darren Thellen, UMass
Defensive Back – Justin Currie, Western Michigan
Punter – Brian Schmiedebusch, Bowling Green 
 
2012 All-MAC Second Team Specialists
Kickoff Return Specialist – Bernard Reedy, Toledo
Punt Return Specialist – Jaime Wilson, Western Michigan
  
2012 All-MAC Third Team Offense
Quarterback – Zac Dysert, Miami
Center – Kevin Galeher, Western Michigan
Offensive Lineman – Greg Mancz, Toledo
Offensive Lineman – Dominic Flewellyn, Bowling Green
Offensive Lineman – Jordan Hansel, Ball State 
Offensive Lineman – Cam Lowry, Ball State
Tight End – Alex Bayer, Bowling Green
Wide Receiver – Marquelo Suel, Akron
Wide Receiver – Andy Cruse, Miami
Wide Receiver – Cody Wilson, Central Michigan 
Wide Receiver – Alonzo Russell, Toledo
Running Back – Jahwan Edwards, Ball State
Running Back – Trayion Durham, Kent State
Placekicker – Jeremiah Detmer, Toledo

2012 All-MAC Third Team Defense
Outside Linebacker – C.J. Malauulu, Kent State 
Outside Linebacker – Alphonso Lewis, Ohio
Inside Linebacker – Dwayne Woods, Bowling Green 
Inside Linebacker – Desmond Bozeman, Western Michigan
Down Lineman – Nate Ollie, Ball State 
Down Lineman – Jake Dooley, Kent State
Down Lineman – Neal Huynh, Ohio
Down Lineman – Ted Ouellet, Bowling Green
Defensive Back – Cam Truss, Bowling Green
Defensive Back – Eric Patterson, Ball State
Defensive Back – Cheatham Norrils, Toledo
Defensive Back – Johnnie Simon, Western Michigan 
Punter – Colter Johnson, UMass

2012 All-MAC Third Team Specialists
Kickoff Return Specialist – Jamill Smith, Ball State
Punt Return Specialist – Jamill Smith, Ball State

Bowl games
The MAC placed seven teams in bowl games in 2012. This was the highest number of MAC bowl teams in the conference's history.  For the first time, the MAC placed a team in a BCS Bowl with Northern Illinois playing in the Orange Bowl.

NOTE: All times are local

Notable players

Previous season

References